Thomas Elias DeSylvia (September 29, 1924 – December 6, 2002) was a high school and college football head coach at various high schools in Portland, Oregon and for one season at Portland State. DeSylvia played at the guard position at Oregon State between 1946 and 1949.

Playing career
DeSylvia played at the guard position at Oregon State between 1946 and 1949. During his tenure at Oregon State, DeSylvia competed in the 1948 East–West Shrine Game, served as team captain in 1949 and was selected to the Oregon State University Sports Hall of Fame in 1994 for his accomplishments. DeSylvia was drafted in the 24th round of the 1950 NFL Draft by the Philadelphia Eagles, but was released the following August before ever competing in a regular-season game.

Coaching career

High school
After leaving professional football, DeSylvia began his coaching career. He was noted for his time as head football coach at Jefferson High School in Portland between 1953 and 1961. During that span, Jefferson won OSAA Championships in 1957 and 1958 and OSAA runner-up in 1959. In addition to the championships, DeSylvia led Jefferson to an Oregon large-school record of 34 consecutive victories between 1957–59, in addition to coaching future Heisman Trophy winner Terry Baker and Pro Football Hall of Fame member Mel Renfro.

Following a one-year stint as head coach at Portland State, DeSylvia returned to the high school ranks to lead both David Douglas High School and Grant High School prior to his retirement. For his impact on sport in Oregon, he was elected to the Oregon Sports Hall of Fame in 1997.

Head coaching record

References

External links
 Profile from the Oregon Sports Hall of Fame (under 1997)

1924 births
2002 deaths
American football guards
Oregon State Beavers football players
Philadelphia Eagles players
Portland State Vikings football coaches
Sportspeople from Portland, Oregon
High school football coaches in Oregon
High school sports in Oregon
Players of American football from Portland, Oregon